Edwin Alexander Smith (born May 22, 1982), is a former American football tight end. He played college football at Stanford and was drafted by the Tampa Bay Buccaneers in the third round of the 2005 NFL Draft. Smith was also a member of the New England Patriots, Philadelphia Eagles, Cleveland Browns, and Cincinnati Bengals, New Orleans Saints, and Washington Redskins.

Early years
Smith attended high school at J. K. Mullen High School in Denver, Colorado. As a senior, he was a Super Prep first-team All-American, Prep Star All-Midlands, All-State and All-Centennial League selection. He was a Nominee for the Fred Steinmark Award, which is given to the Colorado Athlete of the Year. He also played basketball and ran track.

College career
Smith played college football at Stanford University. He was a three-year starter and was runner-up to the John Mackey Award, given to the nation’s top tight end, in 2004. Some of his honors included 2004 second-team consensus All-American, 2004 Team MVP, 2003 Honorable mention All-Pac-10, 2003 Honorable mention academic All-Pac-10 and 2002 Academic All-Pac-10. He finished his career starting 32 of 44 games, making 107 receptions for 1,291 yards and eight touchdowns.

Professional career

Tampa Bay Buccaneers
Smith was drafted by the Tampa Bay Buccaneers in the third round of the 2005 NFL Draft. As a rookie, he started 10 of 16 games and recorded 41 receptions for 367 yards and two touchdowns. In 2006, he started 7 of 14 games and made 35 receptions for 250 and three touchdowns and in 2007 he started all 14 games he played in totaling 385 yards on 32 receptions and three touchdowns. In his last year with the Buccaneers in 2008 he started 12 of 14 games making 21 receptions for 250 yards and three touchdowns.

Smith finished his career with the Buccaneers starting 43 of 58 games, recording 129 receptions for 1,252 yards and 11 touchdowns.

New England Patriots
On April 30, 2009, Smith was traded to the New England Patriots for a fifth round 2010 NFL Draft pick. He was released during final cuts on September 5.

Philadelphia Eagles
Smith signed with the Philadelphia Eagles on September 8, 2009.

Cleveland Browns

Smith signed a one-year contract with the Cleveland Browns on May 4, 2010. He re-signed with them on March 13, 2012.

Cincinnati Bengals
On April 16, 2013, Smith signed with the Cincinnati Bengals.

New Orleans Saints
The New Orleans Saints signed Smith on August 7, 2015. He was waived ten days later.

Washington Redskins
On December 15, 2015, Smith signed with the Washington Redskins.

Personal life
Smith's father, Ed Smith, played defensive end for the Denver Broncos.

Smith married model Angela Gonzalez and they had twin boys Amari and Aiden Smith in 2010 while playing for the Philadelphia Eagles.

Smith won the Madden Bowl in 2006 and 2007 and became the fourth player to win twice.

References

External links
ESPN player profile
Washington Redskins bio
Cincinnati Bengals bio

1982 births
Living people
American people of Bahamian descent
American football tight ends
Stanford Cardinal football players
Tampa Bay Buccaneers players
New England Patriots players
Philadelphia Eagles players
Cleveland Browns players
Cincinnati Bengals players
New Orleans Saints players
Washington Redskins players